Roy de Ruiter (born 19 August 1989) is a Dutch professional footballer who plays as a striker for WAVV.

External links
 Voetbal International

1989 births
People from Wageningen
Living people
Dutch footballers
Association football forwards
SBV Vitesse players
AGOVV Apeldoorn players
TOP Oss players
SV Spakenburg players
Eredivisie players
Eerste Divisie players
Derde Divisie players
Vierde Divisie players
Footballers from Gelderland